Érd HC is a Hungarian handball club, based in Érd, Hungary.

European record
As of 16 July 2019:

EHF-organised seasonal competitions
Érd score listed first. As of 24 February 2020.

Champions League

EHF Cup

Cup Winners' Cup
From the 2016–17 season, the women's competition was merged with the EHF Cup.

References

External links
 Official website
 Érd HC at eurohandball.com

Hungarian handball clubs in European handball